Lewis Armstrong Yeager, first name sometimes spelled Louis (September 10, 1878 – December 10, 1906) was an American football coach He was the seventh head football coach at West Virginia University in Morgantown, West Virginia, serving for two seasons, in 1899 and 1901 to 1902, compiling a record of 5–5.

Yeager died suddenly in 1906 of heart disease. He is interred at Oak Grove Cemetery in Morgantown.

Head coaching record

References

External links
 

1878 births
1906 deaths
West Virginia Mountaineers football coaches
Burials at Oak Grove Cemetery (Morgantown, West Virginia)